Shibboleth is an unincorporated community in Washington County, in the U.S. state of Missouri.

Shibboleth had its start as a mining settlement, and was named after a term mentioned in the Hebrew Bible.

References

Unincorporated communities in Washington County, Missouri
Unincorporated communities in Missouri